Hugh Sinclair (19 May 1903 – 29 December 1962) was a British actor born in London, the son of a clergyman. He was educated at Charterhouse School and was a graduate of the Royal Academy of Dramatic Art. His first marriage was to the actress Valerie Taylor. In his book The Stage Struck Me! fellow actor Neville Phillips felt Sinclair always played variations of himself, handsome, debonair, suave and witty and excelled in light comedy. By contrast Phillips felt his wife, who Sinclair often appeared opposite, was a dramatic actress of tremendous power with a magnificent voice.

Sinclair appeared both on Broadway and in the West End. His screen work began in British films. His most notable role possibly is Leslie Charteris's The Saint in The Saint's Vacation followed by The Saint Meets the Tiger.

Sinclair died in 1962 in Slapton, Devon, England at the age of 59.

Marriages
 1) Valerie Taylor
 2) Rosalie Williams (two children)

Selected filmography 
 Our Betters (1933)
 Escape Me Never (1935)
 Strangers on Honeymoon (1937)
 The Prisoner of Corbal (1939)
 The Four Just Men (1939)
 A Girl Must Live (1939)
 The Saint's Vacation (1941)
 The Alibi (1942)
 Tomorrow We Live (1943)
 The Saint Meets the Tiger (1943)
 They Were Sisters (1945)
 Flight from Folly (1945)
 Corridor of Mirrors (1948)
 Don't Ever Leave Me (1949)
 Trottie True (aka The Gay Lady) (1949)
 The Rocking Horse Winner (1950)
 No Trace (1950)
 Circle of Danger (1951)
 Judgment Deferred (1952)
 Never Look Back (1952)
 The Second Mrs Tanqueray (1953)
 Three Steps in the Dark (1953)

Notes

External links

Hugh Sinclair as The Saint

!colspan="3" style="background:#C1D8FF;"| The Saint Records

1903 births
1962 deaths
English male stage actors
English male film actors
English male television actors
20th-century English male actors
Alumni of RADA
People educated at Charterhouse School